A capillary wave is a wave traveling along the phase boundary of a fluid, whose dynamics and phase velocity are dominated by the effects of surface tension.

Capillary waves are common in nature, and are often referred to as ripples.  The wavelength of capillary waves on water is typically less than a few centimeters, with a phase speed in excess of 0.2–0.3 meter/second.

A longer wavelength on a fluid interface will result in gravity–capillary waves which are influenced by both the effects of surface tension and gravity, as well as by fluid inertia. Ordinary gravity waves have a still longer wavelength.

When generated by light wind in open water, a nautical name for them is cat's paw waves. Light breezes which stir up such small ripples are also sometimes referred to as cat's paws. On the open ocean, much larger ocean surface waves (seas and swells) may result from coalescence of smaller wind-caused ripple-waves.

Dispersion relation
The dispersion relation describes the relationship between wavelength and frequency in waves. Distinction can be made between pure capillary waves – fully dominated by the effects of surface tension – and gravity–capillary waves which are also affected by gravity.

Capillary waves, proper
The dispersion relation for capillary waves is

where  is the angular frequency,  the surface tension,  the density of the 
heavier fluid,  the density of the lighter fluid and  the wavenumber. The wavelength is 

For the boundary between fluid and vacuum (free surface), the dispersion relation reduces to

Gravity–capillary waves

When capillary waves are also affected substantially by gravity, they are called gravity–capillary waves. Their dispersion relation reads, for waves on the interface between two fluids of infinite depth:

The factor  in the first term is the Atwood number.

Gravity wave regime

For large wavelengths (small ), only the first term is relevant and one has gravity waves.
In this limit, the waves have a group velocity half the phase velocity: following a single wave's crest in a group one can see the wave appearing at the back of the group, growing and finally disappearing at the front of the group.

Capillary wave regime
Shorter (large ) waves (e.g. 2 mm for the water–air interface), which are proper capillary waves, do the opposite: an individual wave appears at the front of the group, grows when moving towards the group center and finally disappears at the back of the group. Phase velocity is two thirds of group velocity in this limit.

Phase velocity minimum
Between these two limits is a point at which the dispersion caused by gravity cancels out the dispersion due to the capillary effect.  At a certain wavelength, the group velocity equals the phase velocity, and there is no dispersion. At precisely this same wavelength, the phase velocity of gravity–capillary waves as a function of wavelength (or wave number) has a minimum. Waves with wavelengths much smaller than this critical wavelength  are dominated by surface tension, and much above by gravity. The value of this wavelength and the associated minimum phase speed  are:

If one drops a small stone or droplet into liquid, the waves then propagate outside an expanding circle of fluid at rest; this circle is a caustic which corresponds to the minimal group velocity.

Derivation
As Richard Feynman put it, "[water waves] that are easily seen by everyone and which are usually used as an example of waves in elementary courses [...] are the worst possible example [...]; they have all the complications that waves can have." The derivation of the general dispersion relation is therefore quite involved.

There are three contributions to the energy, due to gravity, to surface tension, and to hydrodynamics. For gravity, an assumption is made of the density of the fluids being constant (i.e., incompressibility), and likewise  (waves are not high enough for gravitation to change appreciably). For surface tension, the deviations from planarity (as measured by derivatives of the surface) are supposed to be small. For common waves both approximations are good enough.

The third contribution involves the kinetic energies of the fluids. It is the most complicated and calls for a hydrodynamic framework. Incompressibility is again involved (which is satisfied if the speed of the waves is much less than the speed of sound in the media), together with the flow being irrotational – the flow is then potential. These are typically also good approximations for common situations. 

The resulting equation for the potential (which is Laplace equation) can be solved with the proper boundary conditions. On one hand, the velocity must vanish well below the surface (in the "deep water" case, which is the one we consider, otherwise a more involved result is obtained, see Ocean surface waves.) On the other, its vertical component must match the motion of the surface.

See also
 Capillary action
 Dispersion (water waves)
 Fluid pipe
 Ocean surface wave
 Thermal capillary wave
 Two-phase flow
 Wave-formed ripple

Gallery

Notes

References

External links

Capillary waves entry at sklogwiki

Fluid dynamics
Water waves
Oceanographical terminology
ar:مويجة